Israel has 92 species of reptiles, almost a third of which live in its northern areas.
Reptiles in Israel live in environments ranging from the Negev Desert to the Red Sea, from the Jordan River to the Judaean Mountains.

Turtles and tortoises

Pond turtles

Red-eared slider (Trachemys scripta)
Balkan pond turtle (Mauremys rivulata)

Sea turtles

Loggerhead sea turtle (Caretta caretta)
Green sea turtle (Chelonia mydas)
Leatherback sea turtle (Dermochelys coriacea)

Softshell turtles

African softshell turtle (Trionyx triunguis)

Tortoises

Spur-thighed tortoise (Testudo graeca)
Negev tortoise (Testudo kleinmanni)

Lizards

Agamid lizards

Starred agama (Stellagama stellio)
Aqaba agama (Pseudotrapelus aqabensis)
Desert agama (Trapelus agnetae)
Savigny's agama (Trapelus savignii)
Egyptian mastigure (Uromastyx aegyptia)
Ornate mastigure (Uromastyx ornata)

Chameleons

Common chameleon (Chamaeleo chamaeleon)

Geckos

Arabian desert gecko (Bunopus tuberculatus)
Rough-tailed gecko (Cyrtopodion scabrum)
Mediterranean house gecko (Hemidactylus turcicus)
Lebanese thin-toed gecko (Mediodactylus amictopholis)
Mediterranean thin-toed gecko (Mediodactylus orientalis)
Sinai fan-fingered gecko (Ptyodactylus guttatus)
Fan-footed gecko (Ptyodactylus hasselquistii)
Israeli fan-fingered gecko (Ptyodactylus puiseuxi)
Middle Eastern short-fingered gecko (Stenodactylus doriae)
Dune gecko (Stenodactylus petrii)
Elegant gecko (Stenodactylus sthenodactylus)
White-spotted wall gecko (Tarentola annularis)
Natterer's gecko (Tropiocolotes nattereri)
Tropiocolotes yomtovi

Glass lizards

European glass lizard (Pseudopus apodus)

Lacertid lizards

Aegyptian fringe-fingered lizard (Acanthodactylus aegyptius)
Be'er Sheva fringe-fingered lizard (Acanthodactylus beershebensis)
Bosc's fringe-toed lizard (Acanthodactylus boskianus)
Arnold's fringe-fingered lizard (Acanthodactylus opheodurus)
Medium lizard (Lacerta media)
Spotted desert racer (Mesalina bahaeldini)
Olivier's sand lizard (Mesalina olivieri)
Snake-eyed lizard (Ophisops elegans)
Kulzer's rock lizard (Phoenicolacerta kulzeri)
Lebanon lizard (Phoenicolacerta laevis)

Monitor lizards

Desert monitor (Varanus griseus)

Skinks

Rüppell's snake-eyed skink (Ablepharus rueppellii)
Günther's cylindrical skink (Chalcides guentheri)
Ocellated skink (Chalcides ocellatus)
Wedge-snouted skink (Chalcides sepsoides)
Schneider's skink (Eumeces schneiderii)
Bridled mabuya (Heremites vittatus)
Latast's snake skink (Ophiomorus latastii)
Sandfish (Scincus scincus)

Snakes

Blindsnakes

Long-nosed worm snake (Leptotyphlops macrorhynchus)
Israeli worm snake (Letheobia simoni)
Eurasian blindsnake (Xerotyphlops vermicularis)

Boas

Javelin sand boa (Eryx jaculus)

Colubrid snakes

Black whipsnake (Dolichophis jugularis)
Crowned dwarf racer (Eirenis coronella)
Ten-striped dwarf racer (Eirenis decemlineatus)
Levantine dwarf racer (Eirenis levantinus)
Eirenis lineomaculatus
Roth's dwarf racer (Eirenis rothii)
Blotched snake (Elaphe sauromates)
Coin-marked snake (Hemorrhois nummifer)
Crowned leafnose snake (Lytorhynchus diadema)
False smooth snake (Macroprotodon cucullatus)
Dice snake (Natrix tessellata)
Red whip snake (Platyceps collaris)
Elegant racer (Platyceps elegantissimus)
Spotted desert racer (Platyceps rogersi)
Sahara racer (Platyceps saharicus)
Sinai racer (Platyceps sinai)
Dayan's kukri snake (Rhynchocalamus dayanae)
Palestine kukri snake (Rhynchocalamus melanocephalus)
Diadem snake (Spalerosophis diadema)
Arabian cat snake (Telescopus dhara)
Mediterranean cat snake (Telescopus fallax)
Hoogstraal's cat snake (Telescopus hoogstraali)
Transcaucasian ratsnake (Zamenis hohenackeri)

Elapid snakes

Desert black snake (Walterinnesia aegyptia)

Lamprophiid snakes

Eastern Montpellier snake (Malpolon insignitus)
False cobra (Malpolon moilensis)
Müller's black-headed snake (Micrelaps muelleri)
Psammophis aegyptius
Schokari sand racer (Psammophis schokari)

Mole vipers

Israeli mole viper (Atractaspis engaddensis)

Vipers

Desert horned viper (Cerastes cerastes)
Arabian horned viper (Cerastes gasperettii)
Saharan sand viper (Cerastes vipera)
Painted saw-scaled viper (Echis coloratus)
Field's horned viper (Pseudocerastes fieldi)
Lebanon viper (Montivipera bornmuelleri)
Palestine viper (Daboia palaestinae)

See also

Wildlife of Israel
Biodiversity in Israel
List of birds of Israel
List of endemic flora of Israel
List of mammals of Israel
Society for the Protection of Nature in Israel

References

Israel
 
reptiles
Israel